Dark Is The Sun is a science fiction novel by American writer Philip José Farmer, first published in 1979. It tells the story of the people and creatures left on Earth when the Sun is dead and the universe is heading towards the Big Crunch.

Plot
By the year 15 billion AD, Earth's species have evolved to the point of being super-selected to a purpose. Every form has a sentient representative: animal, plant, and mineral. Pairing of sentient beings, including humans, is controlled by the use of "Soul Eggs" which are given shortly after birth, worn from the neck and when held up to another belonging to a potential mate will sync in pattern and color to approve marriage. Many times through Earth's existence it faced its end, but each time this event occurred, humanity was at a high point in intelligence and was able to rescue Earth from annihilation. When the sun died, they ignited the moon, and later when the moon died, the Earth was moved to safety. But now Earth's death is approaching during a time when humanity's technological levels are at a low point.

The story opens with Deyv, a human, being forced to leave his tribe, the Turtle Tribe, because he cannot find a mate. After leaving his tribe to find a possible mate from a distant tribe, Deyv runs into trouble and ends up meeting the plant-man Sloosh and a feisty woman named Vana. It is revealed that all three have had their Soul Eggs stolen by the fox-like Yawtl, and they begin a mission to track their Soul Eggs down and recover them. Their search brings them to the Jewelled Wasteland, home of the Shemibob, an ancient female being from another star who knows Earth's demise is near and holds the only key to escape.

Reception
Thomas M. Disch found himself unable to finish reading the novel, describing it as "meant for speed readers whose high-speed attention will construct from the asphalt of the prose a world of low resolution and high escapist involvement; not a novel but a daydream in remedial-reading."

References

Sources
 

1979 American novels
1979 science fiction novels
Novels by Philip José Farmer
Dying Earth (genre)
Del Rey books
Fiction set in the 7th millennium or beyond